Ajuga arabica is a herbaceous flowering plant native to central Saudi Arabia. It was first described in 1980.

References

arabica
Garden plants of Asia
Groundcovers